The 1948 Oregon State Beavers football team represented Oregon State College in the Pacific Coast Conference (PCC) during the 1948 college football season.  In their fourteenth season under head coach Lon Stiner, the Beavers compiled a 5–4–3 record (2–3–2 in PCC, sixth), defeated Hawaii in the Pineapple Bowl on New Year's Day, and outscored their opponents 249 to 236.  The team played its home games on campus at Bell Field in Corvallis and at Multnomah Stadium in Portland.

The following spring at age 45, Stiner resigned as head coach on March 7. He said at the time, "A football coach must have full support in his job. I have had excellent support in the past but when the full support no longer exists, a change is for the best for all parties concerned." With 16 years of service, he was the dean of the PCC football coaches. He compiled a record of 74–49–17 (49–42–13 in PCC) as head coach.

Schedule

References

External links
 Game program: Oregon State at Washington State – November 6, 1948

Oregon State
Oregon State Beavers football seasons
Pineapple Bowl champion seasons
Oregon State Beavers football